Eglon was a Canaanite city-state mentioned in the Hebrew Bible. According to the Book of Joshua, Debir, king of Eglon, joined a confederation against Gibeon when that city made peace with Israel. The five kings involved were slain and Eglon was later conquered and its inhabitants condemned to destruction. It was thereafter included in the territory of the Tribe of Judah, although it is not mentioned outside of the Book of Joshua.

According to K. van Bekkum, the location of Eglon is unknown, but the most plausible candidate is Tel 'Eton.

Tel 'Eton
Tel 'Eton is an archaeological site excavated by an the Bar Ilan University, managed by Avraham Faust. It is the probable site of ancient Eglon. The site of Tel Eton was transformed in the 10th century BCE, and some of the structures built in this site involved ashlar in construction. Prior to these findings, the lack of ashlar construction in this period in the region of Judah was an "oftquoted evidence against the historical plausibility of a kingdom centered in Judah".

References

Canaanite cities
Hebrew Bible places
City-states
Former kingdoms